Kim Weon-Kee (Hangul: 김원기, Hanja: 金原基; January 6, 1962 in Hampyeong, Jeollanam-do – July 27, 2017 in Wonju, Gangwon-do) was a South Korean Greco-Roman wrestler and Olympic champion.

Career
Kim received a gold medal at the 1984 Summer Olympics in Los Angeles. In the group round, he ended four of his five matches by fall or technical fall, including a win over reigning Olympic champion Stelios Mygiakis of Greece by technical fall.

In 1986, Kim retired from competitive wrestling for good after losing his spot for the 1986 Asian Games to future Olympic bronze medalist An Dae-Hyun in the national trial.

Post career
Kim earned his master's degree in exercise physiology from Chonnam National University in 1987 and Ph.D. in physical education from Kyung Hee University in 2009.

Death
Kim died from a heart attack on July 27, 2017 after a hiking trip at Chiaksan. He is survived by is wife.

References

External links

1962 births
2017 deaths
South Korean wrestlers
Olympic wrestlers of South Korea
Wrestlers at the 1984 Summer Olympics
South Korean male sport wrestlers
Olympic gold medalists for South Korea
Olympic medalists in wrestling
Medalists at the 1984 Summer Olympics
Sportspeople from South Jeolla Province
20th-century South Korean people
21st-century South Korean people